The Iceland Air Defence System is a part of the Icelandic Coast Guard. It was founded in 1987 under the Radar Agency of the Icelandic Ministry for Foreign Affairs after an agreement between Iceland and the United States on the takeover by the Icelanders of the operation and maintenance of the radar stations of the Iceland Defense Force. Between 2009–2011, it was a part of the Icelandic Defence Agency (Varnarmálastofnun Íslands). It operates four radar complexes, a software and support facility as well as a command and report centre. , it does not independently possess any offensive capabilities, but is primarily used instead to monitor air traffic and direct allied interceptors based out of country.

The four facilities are located at the four intercardinal points:
 H-1 Miðnesheiði in the Reykjanes peninsula (south-west)
 H-2 Gunnólfsvíkurfjall in the Langanes peninsula (nord-east)
 H-3 Stokksnes near Höfn (south-east)
 H-4 Bolafjall close to Bolungarvík in the Westfjords peninsula (nord-west)

Two older structures, H-2 (Heidharhofn ) and H-4 (Straumnes), were erected by the US and NATO in the late 1950's but where closed few years later due to high operation costs. The new H-2 and H-4 where build almost three decades later.

According to the U.S. Department of State website (Office of Public Diplomacy, Iceland page, updated August 2008), the 2008 budget for the Government of Iceland is the first in the country's history to include funding for defence (US$8.2 million); the money is earmarked for support of cooperative defence activities, military exercises in Iceland, and maintenance of defence-related facilities. This funding is in addition to roughly US$12 million in new expenditures for the operation of the Iceland Air Defence System radar sites, which the United States handed over to Iceland on August 15, 2007. At the start of 2010 Iceland Air Defence reported having a force of 25 employees.

See also 
 Military of Iceland
 Icelandic Coast Guard
 Icelandic Air Policing

References

External links
 Iceland Air Defence System

Defence of Iceland
1987 establishments in Iceland